The 2012–13 Saint Francis Red Flash men's basketball team represented Saint Francis University during the 2012–13 NCAA Division I men's basketball season. The Red Flash, led by first year head coach Rob Krimmel, played their home games at the DeGol Arena and were members of the Northeast Conference. They finished the season 5–24, 5–13 in NEC play to finish in a tie for tenth place. They failed to qualify for the Northeast Conference Basketball tournament.

Roster

Schedule

|-
!colspan=9| Exhibition

|-
!colspan=9| Regular season

References

Saint Francis Red Flash men's basketball seasons
Saint Francis (PA)